Edward Dmytro (September 9, 1931 – April 2, 2010) was the Chief Justice of Saskatchewan, Canada and Chief Justice of the Province's Court of Appeal.

Early life 
Dmytro was born in Alvena, Saskatchewan.  He attended the University of Saskatchewan, where he received a B.A. in 1951 and an LL.B. in 1953.

Jury 
After nearly twenty years of law practice, he was appointed to the Queen's Bench in 1972 and the Court of Appeal in 1974. He became Chief Justice of Saskatchewan in 1981 and retired in September 2006.

Death 
On April 2, 2010, at the age of 78, Dmytro died in Izmir, Turkey.

External links
 University of Saskatchewan biography of Edward Dmytro

1931 births
2010 deaths
Lawyers in Saskatchewan
Judges in Saskatchewan
University of Saskatchewan alumni
University of Saskatchewan College of Law alumni